The Sierra de Alcaraz is a mountain range of the Cordillera Prebética located in Albacete Province, southeast Spain. Its highest peak is the Pico Almenara with an elevation of 1796 m.

See also
Baetic System

Baetic System
Alcaraz